Gaëlle Dumas (born 21 February 2003) is a Haitian footballer who plays as a midfielder for ASF Croix-des-Bouquets and the Haiti women's national team.

Career
Dumas has appeared for the Haiti women's national team, including in the 2020 CONCACAF Women's Olympic Qualifying Championship on 3 February 2020. She came on as a substitute in the 73rd minute for Batcheba Louis in the match against Panama.

References

External links
 

2003 births
Living people
Haitian women's footballers
Haiti women's international footballers
Women's association football midfielders